Jean Simonet (born 5 May 1927) is a Belgian long-distance runner. He competed in the marathon at the 1952 Summer Olympics.

References

External links
 

1927 births
Possibly living people
Athletes (track and field) at the 1952 Summer Olympics
Belgian male long-distance runners
Belgian male marathon runners
Olympic athletes of Belgium
People from Tubize
Sportspeople from Walloon Brabant